The Vanuatu national under-20 football team is the national U-20 team of Vanuatu and is controlled by the Vanuatu Football Federation. It was known as the New Hebrides national under-20 football team until 1980, when the New Hebrides gained their independence and renamed their country to Vanuatu.

History
The Vanuatu national under-20 football team took part in the OFC U-20 Championship tournament 14 times (1974, 1988, 1990, 1992, 1994, 1998, 2001, 2002, 2005, 2007, 2011, 2013, 2014 and 2016). In 2014, the team got the best result with a second place as they finished behind Fiji. Two years later, they would qualify for the 2017 FIFA U-20 World Cup after defeating the Solomon Islands in the semifinals to book a spot and compete at their first ever FIFA tournament.

Competitive record

FIFA U-20 World Cup record

OFC
The OFC Under 20 Qualifying Tournament is a tournament held once every two years to decide the only two qualification spots for the Oceania Football Confederation (OFC) and its representatives at the FIFA U-20 World Cup.

Current technical staff

Vanuatu at the 2017 FIFA U-20 World Cup before a match against Mexico at the Daejeon World Cup Stadium in Daejeon, South Korea.

Current squad
The following players were called up for the 2022 OFC U-19 Championship from 7 to 20 September 2022. Names in italics denote players who have been capped for the Senior team.

Caps and goals as of 20 September 2022 after the game against Tahiti.

Fixtures and results

2014

2016

2017

2018

List of coaches
  Moise Poida (2011–2013)
  Etienne Mermer (2014–2016)
  Declan Edge (2016)
  Dejan Gluščević (2017)
  Paul Munster (2019)
  Kaison Maki (2019-)

References 

 http://www.oceaniafootball.com/ofc/News/ViewArticle/tabid/125/Article/172dac4f-e000-45e9-96e4-66e1b62f8cd0/language/en-US/Default.aspx
 http://olefootballacademy.co.nz/declan-edge/
 http://www.vff.vu

External links
 Vanuatu Football Federation official website

Under-20
Oceanian national under-20 association football teams